Nasimshahr (formerly, Akbarabad (Persian: اکبر آباد), also romanized as Akbarābād) is a city in Bostan District of Baharestan County, Tehran province, Iran, and serves as capital of the county. At the 2006 census, its population was 135,824 in 31,670 households, when it was in Robat Karim County. The following census in 2011 counted 157,474 people in 42,478 households, by which time the district, together with Golestan District, had been separated from the county and Baharestan County established. The latest census in 2016 showed a population of 200,393 people in 58,431 households.

References 

Baharestan County

Cities in Tehran Province

Populated places in Tehran Province

Populated places in Baharestan County